The American River is a tributary of the Jacquot River flowing in the municipality of Sainte-Christine-d'Auvergne, in the MRC Portneuf Regional County Municipality, in the administrative region of Capitale-Nationale, in Quebec, in Canada.

Forestry is the main economic activity in the sector; recreotourism activities, second.

The surface of the American river (except the rapids zones) is generally frozen from the beginning of December to the end of March; however, safe circulation on the ice is generally done from the end of December to the beginning of March.

Geography 
The American River originates from Lake Perthuis (altitude ).

The mouth of this lake is located at:
  northeast of Clair Lake;
  west of the village center of Sainte-Christine-d'Auvergne;
  north-west of the confluence of the Jacquot River and Sainte-Anne River.

  towards the north-east notably by crossing a small unidentified and marshy lake (altitude ), collecting the outlet of Lac Écarté (coming from the north-west) then meandering by collecting the discharge from Lake Praxède (coming from the north-west), to Le Gros Ruisseau (coming from the North) which drains Lac à Théode;
  in a serpentine southeast to its mouth.

After several streamers at the bottom of a valley between two mountains, including the mountain at Jeannot, the American river flows in a bend on the southwest bank of the Jacquot River at:
  west of a curve of the Sainte-Anne River;
  north-west of the village center of Sainte-Christine-d'Auvergne;
  north of the confluence of the Jacquot River and the Sainte-Anne River.

From there, the current descends on  generally south and southwest following the course of the Sainte-Anne River, until on the northwest shore of the St. Lawrence River.

Toponymy 
The toponym "American River" was formalized on December 5, 1968, at the Place Names Bank of the Commission de toponymie du Québec.

See also 

 Sainte-Christine-d'Auvergne
 Portneuf Regional County Municipality
 Jacquot River
 Sainte-Anne River
 List of rivers of Quebec

References

Bibliography

External links 

 

Rivers of Capitale-Nationale